"Su Veneno" is American band Aventura's third single from their fifth and final studio album The Last (2009). The song spent four consecutive weeks at number-one on the tropical charts.

Music video
"Su Veneno" has two different videos, a bachata and a bolero version.

Chart performance

References

2009 singles
Aventura (band) songs
Music videos directed by Jessy Terrero
Songs written by Romeo Santos
2009 songs